Jaina Lee Ortiz (born Jessica Ortiz; November 20, 1986) is an American actress and dancer. She is known for her starring role as Detective Annalise Villa on the Fox police drama Rosewood from 2015 to 2017. In 2018, she began starring as lead in the ABC drama series Station 19.

Early life
Ortiz was born November 20, 1986 in California and raised in The Bronx, New York. Ortiz's father, Joe Ortiz, is Puerto Rican and a retired NYPD first grade detective. She began her dance training at the age of nine by taking salsa/mambo classes; and, at the age of 15, she began teaching. By the next year, Ortiz was traveling internationally as a professional instructor and performer.

Career
Ortiz got her start in acting by appearing in student films. She then studied for two years at Maggie Flanigan Studios, where she learned the Meisner technique. In 2009, Ortiz auditioned and was cast on the second season of VH1’s reality show Scream Queens, where she and nine other aspiring actresses competed in challenges based on acting for the opportunity to win the prize of a role in Saw 3D. The show premiered on August 2, 2010 and on the season finale, Ortiz was named first runner-up. 

In 2012, Ortiz was in a photo used in the Modern Family episode Yard Sale where she was beauty pageant contestant Miss Galapa.

In 2013, Ortiz landed the role as a series regular in The After, produced by The X-Files creator, Chris Carter. The pilot, which began airing via Amazon Video in February 2014, received positive feedback and was ordered to series. However, on January 5, 2015, Amazon Studios announced they would no longer move forward with the show. Two months later, Ortiz was cast as the female lead in a pilot tentatively titled Rosewood, playing opposite Morris Chestnut. The pilot was greenlit to series in May 2015.  Rosewood  premiered on September 23, 2015 on Fox. The series was canceled after two seasons in May 2017. Later that year, she had a recurring role during the second season of USA Network drama series, Shooter. Ortiz also has appeared in the comedy film Girls Trip, playing herself.

In 2017, Ortiz was cast in a leading role on the spin-off to ABC longest-running drama series Grey's Anatomy, titled Station 19.

Filmography

Film

Television

References

External links

 
 
 Images of Jaina Lee Ortiz

Living people

1986 births
21st-century American actresses
21st-century Puerto Rican actresses
Actresses from California
Actresses from New York City
American actresses of Puerto Rican descent
American female dancers
American television actresses
Dance teachers
Dancers from New York (state)
Hispanic and Latino American actresses
Participants in American reality television series
People from the Bronx
Puerto Rican television actresses
Salsa dancers